Epidendrum rigidum is an epiphytic reed-stemmed Epidendrum orchid common throughout the Neotroical lowlands, below .  (The Fora of North America recognizes a distinct species, E. cardiophorum Schltr., which replaces E. rigidum in Mexico and Central America; Kew lists E. cardiophorum Schltr. as a synonym for E. rigidum.)

Description
E. rigidum has been placed in the subgenus E. subg Epidendrum Lindl. (1841) because its sympodial stems do not thicken to form pseudobulbs, its stems are covered by the basal sheaths of its distichous leaves, and its peduncle emerges from the apical leaf without being covered by any bract or sheath. As with other members of E. subsect. Spathacea Rchb.f. 1861, the racemose inflorescence bears enlarged spathaceous floral bracts. The green, non-resupinate, fleshy flowers are partially covered by the large, dolabriform bracts. As with other members of the genus Epidendrum, the lip is adnate to the column to its apex. The lip is heart-shaped where it diverges from the column, ovate, and obtuse at the apex.

The diploid chromosome number of E. rigidum has been determined as 2n = 40.

Homonymy 
 Epidendrum rigidum Lodd. 1829 nom. illeg. is a synonym for E. ramosum Jacq. 1760
 Epidendrum rigidum var. angustisegmentum L.O.Williams 1946 is a synonym for ''E. angustisegmentum (L.O.Williams) Hágsater 1999

References

External links 

 A photograph of the flowers may be found at The Internet Orchid Species Photo Encyclopedia
 Photographs of the flowering plant and leaves may be found at http://www.cybertruffle.org.uk/vinales/eng/epidendrum_rigidum.htm
 http://titanarum.uconn.edu/199100202.html

rigidum
Orchids of Florida
Orchids of Belize
Orchids of Central America
Taxa named by Nikolaus Joseph von Jacquin
Flora without expected TNC conservation status